FlexGo was a technology developed by Microsoft to enable users to pay for using a full-featured personal computer based on the amount of time it used for, similar to pay as you go for cell phones. Another method of payment was a monthly subscription.  It was introduced on May 22, 2006. IBM and other corporations were also adapting similar business models to expand into new markets.

Goals
FlexGo's main target audience was those in third world countries or people with unsteady income. It had been featured under a topic on Leo Laporte's This Week in Tech, Episode 57 "Vloggercon". Microsoft wanted to give people the opportunity to buy their very first computer using FlexGo, and pay for only the time they would use it. Microsoft also planned to team up with telecommunication companies to allow internet access to become a pay as you go feature. The main targeted areas for FlexGo are India, Hungary, Vietnam, Slovenia, and Brazil.

References

External links

Geekzone - Microsoft Introduce Pay-as-you-go Computing
Microsoft Brings Vista To Developing World PCs
Microsoft Pitches Pay-as-you-go PCs
Microsoft Broadsides African Laptop
Prepaid FlexGo Card
Microsoft Partner

Microsoft initiatives